One Man Dog is the fourth studio album by singer-songwriter James Taylor. Released on November 1, 1972, it features the hit "Don't Let Me Be Lonely Tonight", which peaked at number 14 on the Billboard charts on January 13, 1973. The follow-up single, "One Man Parade", also charted but less successfully, peaking at number 67 in the US and reaching number 55 on the Canadian Adult Contemporary chart. The basic tracks were primarily recorded in Taylor's home studio.

The album is made up of 18 short pieces strung together. It climbed to number 4 on the US Billboard Pop Albums chart. There was also a Quadraphonic mix of the album that included alternate vocal takes and elongated versions of some songs.

Track listing
All songs written by James Taylor, except where noted.

Side one
"One Man Parade" - 3:10
"Nobody But You" - 2:57
"Chili Dog" - 1:35
"Fool for You" - 1:42
"Instrumental I" - 0:55
"New Tune" - 1:35
"Back on the Street Again" (Danny Kortchmar) - 3:00
"Don't Let Me Be Lonely Tonight" - 2:34

Side two
"Woh, Don't You Know" (Danny Kortchmar, Leland Sklar, James Taylor) - 2:10
"One Morning in May" (traditional) - 2:54
"Instrumental II" - 1:41
"Someone" (John McLaughlin) - 3:36
"Hymn" - 2:24
"Fanfare" - 2:33
"Little David" - 1:00
"Mescalito" - 0:29
"Dance" - 2:07
"Jig" - 1:13

Personnel

 James Taylor – lead vocals,  backing vocals (1, 9, 16), acoustic guitar (1, 3, 5–12, 16–18), harmonica (1), electric guitar (2, 4, 14, 18), autoharp (5), bells (11), chainsaw (15), hammer (15)
 Danny Kortchmar – electric guitar (1-4, 8, 9, 11, 13–18), timbales (1, 9), acoustic guitar (5, 7, 10, 12)
 John McLaughlin – acoustic guitar (12)
 John Hartford – banjo (17), fiddle (17)
 Dash Crofts – mandolin (17)
 Red Rhodes – steel guitar (17, 18)
 Craig Doerge – acoustic piano (2, 6–10, 12–14, 16, 18), electric piano (2-4, 11, 15)
 Leland Sklar – bass guitar (3-9, 11, 13–18), guitarron mexicano (7, 12, 17)
 Russ Kunkel – congas (1, 2, 6–8, 11), drums (2-5, 8–10, 13–18), tambourine (3, 9), cabasa (6)
 Peter Asher – guiro (1)
 Bobbye Hall – congas (4), tambourine (4), bongos (11), bells (11), shaker (11), percussion (18)
 Mark Paletier – cross-cut saw (15), sound effects (15)
 George Bohanon – trombone (4)
 Art Baron – bass trombone (13, 14, 18)
 Barry Rogers – trombone (13, 14, 18)
 Michael Brecker – tenor sax solo (8), tenor saxophone (13, 14), soprano saxophone (13), flute (18)
 Randy Brecker – trumpet (13, 14, 18), flugelhorn (13), piccolo trumpet (13)
 Abigale Haness – backing vocals (1, 14, 16)
 Carole King – backing vocals (1, 14, 16)
 Carly Simon – backing vocals (1)
 Alex Taylor – backing vocals (1, 9)
 Hugh Taylor – backing vocals (1, 9)
 Kate Taylor – backing vocals (1)
 Linda Ronstadt – backing vocals (10)

Production
 Producer – Peter Asher
 Engineers – Peter Asher (Tracks 1, 3, 6, 8, 9, 11, 15 & 16); Robert Appère (Tracks 2, 4, 5, 10 & 12); Phil Ramone (Tracks 7, 13, 14, 17 & 18).
 Tenor sax solo on Track 8 recorded by Phil Ramone.
 Mixed by Robert Appère
 Mastered by Bernie Grundman at A&M Studios (Hollywood, CA).
 Art Direction – Ed Thrasher
 Photography – Peter Simon

Charts

Weekly charts

Year-end charts

Certifications

References

1972 albums
Concept albums
James Taylor albums
Albums produced by Peter Asher
Warner Records albums
Albums recorded in a home studio